Lamadelaine is a town in the commune of Pétange,  Luxembourg.  , the town has a population of 2,335.

References

Pétange
Towns in Luxembourg